Timeline of the COVID-19 pandemic in the United States may refer to:

 Timeline of the COVID-19 pandemic in the United States (2020)
 Timeline of the COVID-19 pandemic in the United States (2021)
 Timeline of the COVID-19 pandemic in the United States (2022)
 Timeline of the COVID-19 pandemic in the United States (2023)

United States